Roger Frappier (born April 14, 1945) is a Canadian producer, director, editor, actor, and screenwriter.

Biography
Roger Frappier worked in all areas of the film business, from film critic to television commercial director to director/ producer of the experimental feature documentary Le Gand film ordinaire, until he found his true vocation as a hands-on producer. While at the National Film Board of Canada in the early 1980s, he assembled a group of writer/directors who collaborated on developing edgy, urban dramas. The script for Le Déclin de l’empire américain emerged from the process that Frappier had set in motion. With that film’s phenomenal success, Frappier rose to the ranks of the top producers of feature films in Quebec. He left the NFB in 1986 and founded Max Films with Pierre Gendron, producing Un Zoo la nuit in 1987, the winner of 13 Genie Awards, still a record. His many other films include Pouvoir intime, Anne Trister, Jésus de Montréal, Ding et Dong, le film and Cosmos. Members of the Cosmos collective went on to make two of the most celebrated works in recent Québécois cinema, Un 32 août sur terre and Maelström, underscoring Frappier’s eye for fresh talent. His 2003 production, the affable Seducing Doctor Lewis, became one of the highest-grossing films at the domestic box office in Canadian film history.

Filmography

As producer
 1971 : Le Grand film ordinaire
 1974 : On a raison de se révolter
 1977 : Le Manitoba ne répond plus
 1978 : Une journée à Forillon
 1978 : Soils of Canada
 1978 : Kouchibouguac
 1978 : The Battle of the Châteauguay
 1978 : Santa Gertrudis, la première question sur le bonheur
 1979 : La Fiction nucléaire
 1979 : La Loi de la ville
 1980 : Le Deal mexicain
 1980 : De la tourbe et du restant
 1980 : Cordélia
 1981 : Voyage de nuit
 1982 : Comfort and Indifference (Le Confort et l'indifférence)
 1985 : Une guerre dans mon jardin
 1985 : Cochez oui, cochez non
 1985 : Cinéma, cinéma
 1986 : Sonia
 1986 : Anne Trister
 1986 : Intimate Power (Pouvoir intime)
 1986 : The Decline of the American Empire (Le Déclin de l'empire américain)
 1987 : Night Zoo (Un zoo la nuit)
 1989 : Jesus of Montreal (Jésus de Montréal)
 1990 : Un autre homme
 1990 : Moody Beach
 1990 : Ding et Dong : le film
 1992 : Phantom Life (La Vie fantôme)
 1992 : Lapse of Memory
 1992 : El Lado oscuro del corazón (The Dark Side of the Heart or Le Côté obscur du cœur)
 1993 : Love and Human Remains
 1995 : Water Child (L'Enfant d'eau)
 1996 : Cosmos
 1996 : Not Me! (Sous-sol)
 1998 : The Countess of Baton Rouge (La Comtesse de Bâton Rouge)
 1998 : 2 Seconds (2 secondes)
 1998 : August 32nd on Earth (Un 32 août sur terre)
 1999 : Matroni and Me (Matroni et moi)
 2000 : Mack Sennett, roi du comique
 2000 : Life After Love (La Vie après l'amour)
 2000 : Maelström
 2001 : Tar Angel (L'Ange de goudron)
 2002 : Chaos and Desire (La Turbulence des fluides)
 2002 : Le Plateau (série TV)
 2003 : How My Mother Gave Birth to Me During Menopause (Comment ma mère accoucha de moi durant sa ménopause)
 2003 : Père et fils
 2003 : Seducing Doctor Lewis (La Grande Séduction)
 2005 : Tango, un giro extraño
 2005 : Life with My Father (La Vie avec mon père)
 2005 : Saint Martyrs of the Damned (Saints-Martyrs-des-Damnés)
 2006 : The Secret Life of Happy People (La Vie secrète des gens heureux)
 2008: Through the Mist (Dédé, à travers les brumes)
 2010: Crying Out (À l'origine d'un cri)
 2012: Liverpool
 2013: The Grand Seduction
 2013: Another House (L'autre maison)
 2020: Chaakapesh
 2021: The Power of the Dog

As director
 1971 : Le Grand film ordinaire
 1974 : L'Infonie inachevée
 1977 : Samedi - Le Ventre de la nuit
 1977 : Lundi - Une chaumière, un cœur
 1978 : Le Ventre de la nuit
 1984 : Le Dernier glacier
 2000 : Die Fremde
 2020: Chaakapesh

As editor
 1970 : El Assifa
 1971 : Pizzagone
 1971 : Faut aller parmi l'monde pour le savoir
 1974 : L'Infonie inachevée

As actor
 1973 : Réjeanne Padovani : Un militant
 2003 : Père et fils : Pharmacien

As scriptwriter
 1984 : Le Dernier glacier

Awards and nominations

Awards 
 1987 : Genie Award for Best Motion Picture and Golden Reel Award with René Malo, The Decline of the American Empire
 1988 : Genie Award for Best Motion Picture with Pierre Gendron, Un Zoo la nuit
 1990 : Genie Award for Best Motion Picture and Golden Reel Award with Pierre Gendron, Jésus de Montréal
 1991 : Genie Award Golden Reel Award, Ding et Dong : le film
 2001 : Genie Award for Best Motion Picture with Luc Vandal, Maelström
 2022 : Golden Globe Award for Best Motion Picture - Drama, The Power of the Dog

Nominations
 1982 : Genie Award for Best Theatrical Short with Carole Mondello, Voyage de nuit
 1987 : Academy Award for Best Foreign-Language Film with René Malo, The Decline of the American Empire
 1990 : Academy Award for Best Foreign-Language Film with Pierre Gendron, Jésus de Montréal
 1991 : BAFTA for Best Film Not in English with Pierre Gendron, Jésus de Montréal
 1999 : Jutra Award for Best Film, 2 secondes  
 1999 : Jutra Award for Best Film, Un 32 août sur terre 
 2002 : Jutra Award for Best Film with Luc Vandal, L'Ange de goudron
 2004 : Genie Award for Best Motion Picture with Pierre Grendon, Seducing Doctor Lewis
 2007 : Jutra Award for Best Film with Luc Vandal
 2007 : Genie Award for Best Motion Picture, La vie secrète des gens heureux 
 2009 : Jutra Award for Best Film with Luc Vandal, Borderline 
 2014 : Genie Award for Best Film with Barbara Doran, The Grand Seduction
 2022 : Academy Award for Best Picture with Jane Campion, Tanya Seghatchian, Emile Sherman, and Iain Canning, The Power of the Dog

References

External links 

 

Canadian male film actors
1945 births
Film directors from Quebec
Film producers from Quebec
Canadian screenwriters in French
Living people
Place of birth missing (living people)
Prix Albert-Tessier winners
Golden Globe Award-winning producers